Jennifer Morla (born 1955, New York City) is a graphic designer and professor based in San Francisco. She received the Cooper Hewitt Smithsonian National Design Award in Communication Design in 2017.

Early life and education 
Morla attended the University of Hartford in Connecticut studying conceptual art before receiving her Bachelor of Fine Arts in Communication Design in 1978 from Massachusetts College of Art and Design in Boston, Massachusetts. She is also mother of 2 girls. Morla married Nilas de Matran, an architect.

She was influenced to undertake her career as an artist through visits to the MOMA growing up in Manhattan, seeing Charles and Ray Eames' IBM exhibit and films at the 1964 Worlds Fair, and her aunt's career as editor in the art department at Condé Nast.

Career

Design work 
After graduation in 1979, Morla was hired at PBS station KQED in San Francisco. Her job consisted of her designing on-air, print graphics and designing animated openings.

In 1981, she was hired as the head of the art department of Levi Strauss & Co. Her job role consisted of designing the store environment, logos, packaging, and labels for the advertising purposes of the brand.

In 1984, she founded Morla Design. Clients include The New York Times, Levi Strauss & Co., Apple Computer, Herman Miller, Stanford University, and Luna Textiles. She has worked extensively with conceptual art venues designing identities, books and posters for The Mexican Museum, SculptureCenter, Capp Street Project, and New Langton Arts. In 1995, she created a poster celebrating the 20th anniversary of the San Francisco Mexican Museum entitled El Museo Mexicano. The piece featured vibrant colors, print and pattern as a way to pay tribute to the Mexican culture.

In 2000, Morla collaborated with Nordstrom creating a new face for the store's credit card to appeal to its consumers. The four holographic cards with vibrant colors and bold patterns reflected a reinvented version of the brand. In 2019, Morla worked with the brand K&M Confections creating the packaging for their milk chocolate to create three different styles of packaging for the types of flavored chocolate featuring the same typeface and foil lettering texture. Morla joined Design Within Reach in 2006 and developed campaigns emphasizing sustainability.

Morla is regularly invited to judge design competitions, for instance the Webby Awards. She is a member of the Alliance Graphique Internationale (AGI).

Her design work is featured in museums such as the SFMoMA and referenced in books such as Meggs' History of Graphic Design, and was the object of a monography in 2019. It is archived at the San Francisco-based Letterform Archive.

Teaching 
Since 1992 she has taught as an adjunct professor at California College of the Arts.

Awards and recognition 

Cooper Hewitt, Communication Design, 2017
AIGA Medal, for her "ability to surprise and inform through her poignant communication designs for global brands and arts institutions, and for instilling that skill in others through her teaching," 2010
Alliance Graphique Internationale (AGI)
 Graphis Design Annual Platinum Award, 2015 and 2016
her work for Design Within Reach received the AIGA Corporate Leadership Award inn 2008

Exhibitions and collections

Permanent collections 

 MOMA 
 San Francisco Museum of Modern Art
 Smithsonian American Art Museum 
 Denver Art Museum
 Library of Congress
 Museum of Craft and Design

Solo exhibitions 

 2012 The Workshop Residence, San Francisco, CA The Workshop Residence: Jennifer Morla Artist in Residence
 2010 California College of the Arts, CCA, San Francisco, CA Jennifer Morla: AIGA Medalist 
 1999 San Francisco Museum of Modern Art, San Francisco, CA Jennifer Morla, Selections from the Permanent Collection
 1999 K Kimpton Contemporary Art, San Francisco, CA Jennifer Morla, Encaustic Works on Canvas 
 1996 Bedford Gallery, Walnut Creek, CA Morla: Bay Area Portfolio
 1994 DDD Design Gallery, Osaka, Japan Jennifer Morla

Group exhibitions

 2016 San Francisco Museum of Modern Art, San Francisco, CA Typeface to Interface: Graphic Design from the Collection
 2003 Museum of Art and Design, New York, NY US Design 1975-2000
 2002 Denver Art Museum, Denver, CO US Design 1975-2000
 1998 Smithsonian American Art Museum, Washington, D.C. Posters American Style
 1985 Grand Palais, Paris, France US Posters
 1995 Brandenburg Art Gallery, Berlin USA-Posters

Works in publications

 The Designer’s Dictionary of Color, Sean Adams
 Meggs' History of Graphic Design (5th Edition), Alston Purvis
 The Poster: 1000 Posters from Toulouse-Lautrec to Sagmeister, Cees W. de Jong
 Launching the Imagination, Mary Stewart
 Glimmer: How Design Can Change Your Life, Warren Berger
 i-D 2008
 Women of Design: Influence and Inspiration, Armin Vit & Bryony Gomez 
Teaching Graphic Design, Steven Heller
Graphic Design America 3, Jenny Sullivan
 The New York Times Magazine
 Graphis Magazine
 Graphis Poster, Jennifer Morla foreword and introduction
 Communication Arts Magazine 
 Women in Graphic Design, Gerda Breuer, Julia Meer
 HOW 15 Masters of Design: Jennifer Morla
 IDEA Magazine (Japan)
 Linea Graphica (Italy)
 A Diseño (Mexico)
 Novum (Germany)

References
 Graphis Poster Annual 2011,  Morla Design awarded Graphis Poster Annual 2011 Gold
 CCA Graphic Design's Jennifer Morla Awarded High Honors with AIGA Medal, CCA News, May 17, 2010
 , Interview by Sean Adams, Step Inside Design, July/August 2006.
 , Interviews & Profiles by Emily Potts, Step Inside Design, Nov/Dec 2005.
Jennifer Morla interview At the “Success Ideas and Tips from Master Graphic Designer, Jennifer Morla.” The Sherwood Group, 28 May 2014,

Sources

External links 
 morladesign.com
 Jennifer Morla Designisms
 Jennifer Morla interview

American graphic designers
Women graphic designers
Massachusetts College of Art and Design alumni
American women artists
AIGA medalists
National Design Award winners